James Bennett Williamson (born December 18, 1956, in Indianapolis, Indiana) is a retired American professional boxer who held the WBC light heavyweight title in 1985.

Professional career

Williamson turned pro in 1979 after a successful amateur career and won the Vacant WBC Light Heavyweight Title in 1985 in a decision over Prince Mama Mohammed. He lost the title in his first defense against Dennis Andries. Although he never challenged again for another major title, he moved up to heavyweight and became a journeyman fighter, fighting until 1995, losing matches against notable heavyweights Henry Akinwande, Peter McNeeley, Jimmy Thunder, and George Foreman.

Professional boxing record

See also
List of world light-heavyweight boxing champions

References

External links

!colspan=3 style="background:#C1D8FF;"| Regional boxing titles

1956 births
Living people
Middleweight boxers
Light-heavyweight boxers
Heavyweight boxers
World light-heavyweight boxing champions
World Boxing Council champions
Winners of the United States Championship for amateur boxers
Sportspeople from Indianapolis
Boxers from Indiana
American male boxers
African-American boxers
United States Marines
21st-century African-American people
20th-century African-American sportspeople